"More" is a song written by Del Gray of Little Texas along with Thom McHugh, and recorded by American country music artist Trace Adkins.  It was released in January 2000 as the second single and title track from his album of the same name.  It peaked at number 10 on the United States Billboard Hot Country Singles & Tracks chart, and number 4 on the Canadian RPM Country Tracks chart.

Critical reception
Deborah Evans Price, of Billboard magazine reviewed the song favorably, saying that when Adkins' "warm-throated baritone comes barreling along, listeners will be absolutely hooked." She calls the production "inventive" and says that it has a "radio-friendly feel and sing-along chorus."

Music video
The music video was directed by Steven Goldmann, and features Trace Adkins during his touring.

Chart positions
"More" debuted at number 65 on the U.S. Billboard Hot Country Singles & Tracks for the week of January 29, 2000.

Year-end charts

References

2000 singles
Trace Adkins songs
Music videos directed by Steven Goldmann
Capitol Records Nashville singles
1999 songs
Songs written by Thom McHugh